Charles Jay-R Strowbridge II (born February 19, 1988) is an American professional basketball player for Venados de Mazatlán of the Circuito de Baloncesto de la Costa del Pacífico (CIBACOPA). He played college basketball for Nebraska, Jacksonville State, and Oregon before playing professionally.

Strowbridge attended Sparkman High School in Huntsville, Alabama, where he received all-state honors during his junior and senior season. After leading the Senators to the state playoffs in 2005 and 2006, he committed to playing for the Nebraska Cornhuskers, where he remained for two seasons before transferring to Jacksonville State. After one season with the Gamecocks, he transferred yet again, this time to Arkansas State. However, he left due to an NCAA investigation into the school and joined Oregon for his final year of eligibility.

In 2018, Strowbridge won the Albanian Basketball Superliga championship and the Albanian Basketball Cup with Tirana.

High school career 
Strowbridge played basketball for the Senators at Sparkman High School in Huntsville, Alabama, under head coach Luther Tiggs.

During his sophomore season, Strowbridge averaged 11.2 points per game. During his junior season, he averaged 12.5 points, four rebounds and four assists per game and led the Senators to the state semifinals. Strowbridge was named the Northwest Region 8 MVP thanks to the Senators' run. He was named the most valuable player (MVP) of the 2005 Alabama High School North-South All-Star Game after he logged 20 points, six assists and two rebounds. Strowbridge received all-state, all-district, and all-region honors in his junior season, and he was also named the Senators' team MVP.

During his senior season, Strowbridge averaged 19.7 points, five assists, four rebounds and three steals per game and led the Senators to a 32–4 record and an Elite Eight appearance in the Alabama state playoffs. He was named the 2006 Super All-Metro MVP and yet again received all-state, all-district, and all-region honors. Strowbridge was also named the Senators' team MVP for the second time in a row. He was named the MVP of the 2006 Mississippi-Alabama All-Star Game after scoring 18 points. During his final two seasons, Strowbridge led the Senators to a 59–14 overall record.

Recruiting 
Strowbridge was ranked a two-star recruit by 247Sports.

College career 
Strowbridge initially signed a letter of intent to play for the Murray State Racers, but withdrew on his signing after a coaching change occurred on the team. On February 1, 2006, Strowbridge signed a letter of intent to play for the Nebraska Cornhuskers. On May 22, he officially committed to playing for the team.

In July 2008, Strowbridge transferred to Jacksonville State, but was forced to sit out the 2008–09 season due to NCAA transfer rules.

Strowbridge transferred yet again in 2010, this time to Arkansas State. However, he withdrew after the school came under NCAA investigation. In September 2010, he decided to join Oregon, but was not forced to sit out a season.

Professional career

Rio Grande Valley Vipers (2011–2012) 
Strowbridge joined the Rio Grande Valley Vipers of the NBA G League after a successful tryout in November 2011. On December 20, he was waived by the Vipers, but was re-signed on December 30. He was waived for a second time on January 7, 2012.

Baskets Oldenburg (2012) 
On March 1, 2012, Strowbridge signed with Baskets Oldenburg of the Basketball Bundesliga.

Cluj-Napoca (2012–2013) 
Strowbridge started off the 2012–13 season with Mobitelco Cluj-Napoca of the Liga Națională.

Danilovgrad (2013) 
On February 26, 2013, Strowbridge signed with Danilovgrad of the Prva A Liga.

Cuxhaven BasCats (2013–2014) 
Strowbridge played with the Cuxhaven BasCats of the ProA during the 2013–14 season.

Apollon Limassol (2015–2016) 
Strowbridge played with Apollon Limassol of the Cypriot League during the 2015–16 season.

MIA Academy (2016) 
Strowbridge played out part of the 2015–16 season with MIA Academy of the Georgian Superliga.

Akademia (2016) 
Strowbridge spent the end of the 2015–16 with Akademia of the Georgian Superliga.

Tirana (2017–2018) 
On October 26, 2017, Strowbridge signed with Tirana of the Albanian Basketball Superliga and the Balkan International Basketball League.

Cape Breton Highlanders (2019) 
On February 9, 2019, Strowbridge signed with the Cape Breton Highlanders of the National Basketball League of Canada.

Memphis Hustle (2019) 
After being a member of the Memphis Hustle's training camp roster in 2018, the team claimed Strowbridge off waivers on February 25, 2019. On March 28, 2019, he hit a game-winning buzzer beater against the Stockton Kings to help the Hustle advance to the second round of the playoffs and give them their first playoff win in franchise history. The Hustle later suffered a 118–135 loss to the Rio Grande Valley Vipers, Strowbridge's old team, in the second round of the playoffs.

Return to Cape Breton (2019) 
After the Hustle were eliminated from the G League playoffs, Strowbridge re-joined the Cape Breton Highlanders for the NBL Canada playoffs, where they were eliminated 2–3 in the division semifinals by the Halifax Hurricanes.

Venados de Mazatlán (2023–present) 
On January 23, 2023, Strowbridge signed with Venados de Mazatlán of the Circuito de Baloncesto de la Costa del Pacífico (CIBACOPA).

Career statistics

College 

|-
| style="text-align:left;"| 2006–07
| style="text-align:left;"| Nebraska
| 29 || 13 || 19.2 || .409 || .463 || .708 || 1.4 || 1.4 || .2 || .0 || 3.9
|-
| style="text-align:left;"| 2007–08
| style="text-align:left;"| Nebraska
| 32 || 4 || 18.6 || .363 || .368 || .800 || 1.5 || 1.6 || .3 || .0 || 4.8
|-
| style="text-align:left;"| 2008–09
| style="text-align:center;" colspan="12"|  Redshirt
|-
| style="text-align:left;"| 2009–10
| style="text-align:left;"| Jacksonville State
| 12 || 9 || 27.4 || .328 || .373 || .787 || 2.3 || 2.3 || .8 || .0 || 12.5
|-
| style="text-align:left;"| 2009–10
| style="text-align:left;"| Oregon
| 39 || 6 || 25.6 || .404 || .333 || .770 || 2.4 || 1.0 || .7 || .1 || 9.4
|- class="sortbottom"
| style="text-align:center;" colspan="2"| Career
| 112 || 32 || 22.2 || .382 || .367 || .773 || 1.9 || 1.4 || .5 || .0 || 7.0

References 

1988 births
Living people
American men's basketball players
Basketball players from Alabama
Oregon Ducks men's basketball players
Point guards